Julius Valentijn Stein van Gollenesse (17 February 1691, Groel, Sweden - 14 January 1755, Batavia, Dutch East Indies) was the 27th Dutch Governor of Ceylon during the Dutch period in Ceylon. He was appointed on 11 May 1743 and was Governor until 6 May 1751. He was succeeded by Gerard Joan Vreeland.

Stein van Gollenesse was born in Sweden into a family of Mecklenburg. In 1723 he joined the Dutch East India Company (VOC), for which he was commander of Cochin from 1734 to 1743, governor of Ceylon from 1743 until 1751, and finally director-general in Batavia from 1751 until his death.

References

1691 births
1755 deaths
18th-century Dutch people
Governors of Dutch Ceylon
Dutch East India Company people